John Henry Kelley (July 10, 1927 – September 16, 2020) was an American ice hockey coach and a member of the United States Hockey Hall of Fame. Kelley was the first general manager and head coach of the New England Whalers of the World Hockey Association (WHA). During the 1972-73 season, he won the Howard Baldwin Trophy as the WHA coach of the year, and also led the Whalers to the Avco World Trophy. He previously served as head coach at Boston University, leading the Terriers to back-to-back NCAA hockey championships in 1971 and 1972. In his 10 year coaching career at Boston U (1962–71), he compiled a .720 winning percentage and won six Beanpot Tournaments.

Kelley, who was born in Medford, Massachusetts, also played his college hockey at Boston U, participating in the NCAA Hockey Tournament in 1951 and 1952. At the time of his graduation, he was the school's all time leading scorer among defensemen. He then took over as coach at Colby College in 1955. After leaving the Whalers, he later worked in the front offices of the Detroit Red Wings and Pittsburgh Penguins. His son is television writer and producer, David E. Kelley.

Honors
In 2010, he was elected as an inaugural inductee into the World Hockey Association Hall of Fame in the coaching category.

Head coaching record

College

WHA

References

External links
 

1927 births
2020 deaths
American ice hockey coaches
Boston University Terriers men's ice hockey coaches
Boston University Terriers men's ice hockey players
Colby Mules men's ice hockey coaches
Detroit Red Wings personnel
Hartford Whalers executives
Ice hockey coaches from Massachusetts
Ice hockey players from Massachusetts
New England Whalers coaches
Pittsburgh Penguins people
Sportspeople from Medford, Massachusetts
United States Hockey Hall of Fame inductees
World Hockey Association coaches